Valentina Visconti (1371 – 4 December 1408) was a countess of Vertus, and duchess consort of Orléans as the wife of Louis I, Duke of Orléans, the younger brother of King Charles VI of France. As duchess of Orléans she was at court and acquired the enmity of the Queen of France, Isabeau of Bavaria-Ingolstadt, and was subsequently banned from the court and had to leave Paris. Due to political animosity, Valentina's husband was murdered in 1407. She died on 4 December 1408.

Life
Valentina was born in Pavia as the second of the four children of Gian Galeazzo Visconti, the first Duke of Milan, and his first wife Isabelle, a daughter of King John II the Good of France. After her mother's death in childbirth in 1373, Valentina and her siblings were raised by their paternal grandmother Bianca of Savoy and aunt Violante Visconti. The deaths of her brothers Carlo (1374), Gian Galeazzo (1376) and Azzone (1381) left Valentina as the only surviving child of her parents' marriage and the Countess of Vertus, a title she shared with her spouse.

Betrothals
In 1379, Valentina was betrothed to her cousin Carlo Visconti, Lord of Parma, son of Bernabò Visconti, and a papal dispensation was even granted; however, Bernabò later annulled the betrothal and, in 1382, married his son to a French noblewoman, Beatrice of Armagnac.

In 1385 Gian Galeazzo became the sole ruler over the Visconti inheritance, and with this Valentina's status changed considerably. At this point, the new Lord of Milan opened negotiations with King Wenceslaus of Germany and Bohemia for a marriage between Valentina and his half-brother John of Görlitz; at the same time, he also negotiated a union with Louis II of Anjou, titular King of Naples. However, Marie of Blois, Dowager Duchess of Anjou finally cancelled the negotiations, and then Gian Galeazzo turned his attention to his nephew-by-marriage Louis, Duke of Touraine, second son of King Charles V of France and brother of the reigning Charles VI. King Wenceslaus became aware of the double game of Gian Galeazzo, and broke off the negotiations with a letter full of insults, leaving Louis, her first cousin, the only suitor of Valentina.

Marriage
Because of the close relationship between bride and groom, a papal dispensation was granted on 25 November 1386, and the marriage contract was signed on 27 January 1387 in Paris. Valentina received as a dowry the County of Vertus (which was the dowry of her own mother at the time of her marriage in 1348) and the city of Asti, with the sums of 450,000 florins in cash and 75,000 florins in jewelry. In the contract was also stipulated that in absence of male heirs, Valentina would inherit the Visconti dominions. It was because of this, that her grandson Louis XII of France claimed the Duchy of Milan and embarked on the Italian Wars. The marriage by proxy was celebrated three months later, on 8 April, in both the Milanese and French courts.

Valentina was only able to leave Milan for France on 23 June 1389, because of "reasons of security" given to her father: in fact, Gian Galeazzo wanted to amend the marriage contract after the pregnancy of his second wife Caterina Visconti (another Bernabò's daughter) ended. Only after the birth of his son Gian Maria on 7 September 1388 did he feel secure enough to send his daughter to France.

Escorted by her paternal cousin Amadeus VII, Count of Savoy and a retinue of 300 knights, Valentina was finally handed to Louis's envoys. The formal marriage took place in the city of Melun, on 17 August 1389.

In June 1392 her husband exchanged the Duchy of Touraine for the Duchy of Orléans; since then, Valentina was styled Duchess of Orléans. Because of intrigues at the court of Charles VI of France and the enmity of the queen, Isabeau of Bavaria-Ingolstadt, Valentina was exiled from the court and had to leave Paris. There were rumours that Isabeau was having an affair with Louis and that Valentina was very close to the King, who was in poor mental health.

A patroness of Eustache Deschamps, who wrote poetry in her honour, Valentina was also the mother of one of France's most famous poets, Charles of Orléans.

Valentina's husband's murder was orchestrated by his cousin and political rival John the Fearless, Duke of Burgundy in 1407. Valentina outlived her husband by only a little over a year, dying at Blois on 4 December 1408.

Burial
Valentina was buried at the Celestins convent of the Orleans chapel in Paris. Her monument tomb was commissioned in 1508 by her grandson Louis XII of France. It was moved to Basilica of Saint-Denis between 1817 and 1818.

Issue
Valentina and Louis had:

Charles, Duke of Orléans (Hôtel royal de Saint-Pol, Paris, 24 November 1394 - Château d'Amboise, Indre-et-Loire, 4 January 1465), father of King Louis XII of France.
Philip, Count of Vertus (Asnières-sur-Oise, Val d'Oise, 21/24 July 1396 - Beaugency, Loiret, 1 September 1420).
John, Count of Angoulême (24 June 1399 – Château de Cognac, Charente, 30 April 1467), grandfather of King Francis I of France.  
Margaret (4 December 1406 - Abbaye de Laguiche, near Blois, 24 April 1466), married Richard of Brittany, Count of Étampes. She received the County of Vertus as a dowry.

Ancestors

See also
List of female rulers and title holders

References

Sources

14th-century births
1408 deaths
Nobility from Milan
Valentina
Valentina
Valentina
14th-century Italian women
14th-century Italian nobility
15th-century Italian women
15th-century Italian nobility
14th-century French women
15th-century French women
15th-century French people